Thyrosticta melanisa is a moth in the subfamily Arctiinae. It was described by Paul Griveaud in 1969. It is found on Madagascar.

References

Moths described in 1969
Arctiinae